Xuyên Mộc is a rural district of Bà Rịa–Vũng Tàu province in the Southeast region of Vietnam. As of 2003, the district had a population of 132,117. The district covers an area of 642 km².

Overview 
This city is home to primitive forest in which there exists a significant elephant population. Xuyên Mộc is noted for its hot spring in Bình Châu - Phước Bửu natural reserve which is available to tourists. Xuyên Mộc is located by the South China Sea and is known for its white sand, beaches and seafood. 

Beaches in the area include Hồ Tràm Beach, which is starting to see numerous new high end developments come up, including The Grand Hồ Tràm Strip (formerly known as MGM Hồ Tràm Casino & Resort), Melia Ho Tram Beach Resort and several additional private developments along the main Hồ Tràm Beach. Hồ Cốc beach is also nearby is a common weekend destination for Ho Chi Minh City residents.

Administrative divisions
The district is divided into one township, the capital of Phước Bửu, and 12 communes: Phước Thuận, Phước Tân, Xuyên Mộc, Bông Trang, Bàu Lâm, Hòa Bình, Hòa Hưng, Hòa Hiệp, Hòa Hội, Bưng Riềng, Tân Lâm and Bình Châu.

References

Districts of Bà Rịa-Vũng Tàu province
Bà Rịa-Vũng Tàu province